The 2022–23 EuroLeague Women is set to be the 65th edition of the European women's club basketball championship organized by FIBA, and the 26th edition since being rebranded as the EuroLeague Women.

Teams
League positions of the previous season shown in parentheses (TH: EuroLeague Women title holders; EC: EuroCup Women title holders).

Referees

Qualifying round

Qualifiers play-off

|}
Source: FIBA
(Q) Qualified for the phase indicated

Qualifying Tournament A

Qualifying Tournament B

Regular season

Group A

Group B

Quarterfinals

|}

See also 
 2022–23 EuroCup Women

References

External links
 

2022–23 in European women's basketball leagues
EuroLeague Women seasons